The second season of Medium, an American television series, began September 19, 2005, and ended on May 22, 2006. It aired on NBC. Starting this season, David Cubitt joined the main cast.

Cast and characters

Main cast 
 Patricia Arquette as Allison DuBois
 Miguel Sandoval as Manuel Devalos
 David Cubitt as Lee Scanlon
 Sofia Vassilieva as Ariel DuBois
 Maria Lark as Bridgette DuBois
 Jake Weber as Joe DuBois

Recurring cast 
 Madison and Miranda Carabello as Marie DuBois
 Bruce Gray as Joe's Dad
 Tina DiJoseph as Lynn DiNovi
 Conor O'Farrell as Larry Watt
 Ryan Hurst as Michael "Lucky" Benoit (Allison's Half Brother)

Episodes

References

External links 
 
 

Medium
2006 American television seasons
Medium (TV series) seasons